Joseph F. Kahn (born August 19, 1964) is an American journalist who currently serves as executive editor of The New York Times.

Education 
Kahn graduated from Harvard University in 1987, where he earned a bachelor's degree in American history and served as president of The Harvard Crimson. In 1990, he received a master's degree in East Asian studies from the Harvard Graduate School of Arts and Sciences.

Career 
Kahn joined the Times in January 1998, after four years as China correspondent for The Wall Street Journal.  Before the Journal, he was a reporter at The Dallas Morning News, where he was part of a team of reporters awarded the Pulitzer Prize in 1994 for international reporting for their stories on violence against women around the world. In June 1989, the Chinese government ordered Kahn to leave the country because he was working as a reporter while using a tourist visa.

In 2006, Kahn and Jim Yardley won the Pulitzer Prize for International Reporting. for the Times covering rule of law in China.

Kahn was assistant masthead editor for International at The Times from 2014 to September 2016.

Personal life
Kahn is of Lithuanian Jewish descent and the eldest child of Dorothy Davidson and Leo Kahn (1916–2011), founder of the Purity Supreme supermarket chain in New England and co-founder of the global office supply chain Staples. Leo had been awarded a journalism degree from Columbia University, after which he briefly had worked as a reporter, prompting a continuing interest in journalism that was reflected in his frequent dissection of newspaper coverage with his son.

References

External links 
 Interview with Kahn about being a journalist in China
 Interview on Charlie Rose

1964 births
Writers from Boston
Living people
American people of Lithuanian-Jewish descent
American male journalists
Pulitzer Prize for International Reporting winners
The New York Times editors
The Dallas Morning News people
20th-century American journalists
Jewish American journalists
The New York Times people
The Harvard Crimson people